St. Peter's Seminary May Refer to:

 St Peter's Seminary, Bearsden, previously on the site of Bearsden Academy
 St Peter's Seminary, Cardross, Scotland
 St. Peter's Seminary (Diocese of London, Ontario), Canada

See also
 St Peter's College (disambiguation)